

Qualification summary

Men's

Men's individual

*Open to countries not already qualified.

Men's team

* Was staged right after the above regional qualification tournaments, in which 2 teams from any region can qualify.

Women's

Women's individual

*Open to countries not already qualified.
Puerto Rico qualified 3 athletes however, they will not be allowed to enter a women's team.

Women's team

* Was staged right after the above regional qualification tournaments, in which 2 teams from any region can qualify.

References

External links
Results of the qualification tournaments

Qualification for the 2011 Pan American Games
Table tennis at the 2011 Pan American Games